John Dragani (born 20 December 1967) is a Swiss football manager.

References

1967 births
Living people
Swiss men's footballers
Association football forwards
Swiss football managers
FC Lausanne-Sport managers
FC Stade Nyonnais managers